Scott Hicks (born April 3, 1966) is an American former college basketball coach. He was head coach at Le Moyne College, University at Albany, SUNY and Loyola University Maryland.

Hicks came to Le Moyne as a student-athlete in 1984 to play for coach John Beilein. He was a four-year letterman for the Dolphins, leading the team to the East Regional of 1988 NCAA Division II men's basketball tournament. Following his college career, he played professionally for the Rheineck Sea Horses in New Zealand. He received his first college coaching job as an assistant at Hamilton College, where he served from 1988 to 1990. He then obtained a master's degree in higher education administration from Syracuse University, where he also served as a graduate assistant for the men's basketball team.

In 1992, Hicks was hired by his alma mater as the youngest head men's basketball coach in the NCAA at age 26. He spent five seasons at Le Moyne, compiling a five-year record of 87–56. In 1997, Hicks was hired as head coach at Albany as the school was making a move from Division II to Division I status. Hicks led the Great Danes through the division transition process and led the team to an 11–17 record in its first season as a Division I independent in 1999–2000. He then left for the head coaching position at Loyola in Baltimore, Maryland.

Hicks spent four seasons at the helm of the Greyhounds, compiling a record of 16–97. The 2003–04 season was a particularly dismal one for Hicks and the Greyhounds. The team extended a 31-game losing streak that threatened to match the NCAA futility record (33 games). Hicks was fired after his team went 1–27 for the season.

References

External links
Division I coaching record
Le Moyne HOF profile

1966 births
Living people
Albany Great Danes men's basketball coaches
American expatriate basketball people in New Zealand
American men's basketball coaches
American men's basketball players
Basketball coaches from New York (state)
Basketball players from New York (state)
College men's basketball head coaches in the United States
Forwards (basketball)
Hamilton Continentals men's basketball coaches
Le Moyne Dolphins men's basketball coaches
Le Moyne Dolphins men's basketball players
Loyola Greyhounds men's basketball coaches
People from Oneida, New York
Syracuse University alumni